Jack Jerome Ahearn (8 October 1924 – 10 April 2017) was an Australian Grand Prix motorcycle road racer. His best season was in 1964 when he won the 500cc Finnish Grand Prix and finished second to Mike Hailwood in the 500cc world championship. On 16 January 2001, Ahearn was awarded the Australian Sports Medal for his achievements. Ahearn died on 10 April 2017 in Ballina.

Motorcycle Grand Prix results 

(key) (Races in bold indicate pole position; races in italics indicate fastest lap)

References

1924 births
2017 deaths
Australian motorcycle racers
Motorcycle racers from Sydney
125cc World Championship riders
350cc World Championship riders
500cc World Championship riders
Isle of Man TT riders
Place of birth missing
Recipients of the Australian Sports Medal